Sergio García Dols (born 22 March 2003) is a Spanish motorcycle rider who is scheduled to race in Moto2 with Flexbox HP40. He comes from Burriana in the Valencian Community. He previously competed in Moto3, becoming the vice-champion of the 2022 Moto3 World Championship.

Career

Early career
At national level García won the 2015 CEV Challenge 80 and the 2016 CEV Pre Moto3.

He is member of the Estrella Galicia Junior Academy since 2016.

He finished runner-up to Raúl Fernández in the 2018 FIM CEV Moto3 Junior World Championship.

Moto3 World Championship

Estrella Galicia 0,0 (2019–2020)
He graduated to Moto3 Grand Prix racing the following season.

Aspar Team (2021–2022)

From 2021, he compete for Aspar Team Moto3 with his teammate Izan Guevara.

Moto2 World Championship

Flexbox HP40 (from 2023)
Garcia graduated to Moto2 World Championship riding for Flexbox HP40.

Career statistics

FIM CEV Moto3 Junior World Championship

Races by year
(key) (Races in bold indicate pole position, races in italics indicate fastest lap)

Grand Prix motorcycle racing

By season

By class

Races by year
(key) (Races in bold indicate pole position; races in italics indicate fastest lap)

References

External links

 

2003 births
Living people
Spanish motorcycle racers
Moto3 World Championship riders
Sportspeople from Valencia
People from Burriana
Sportspeople from the Province of Castellón